Living on the Edge is a British reality television show that first aired on 14 October 2007 on MTV UK. It documented the lives of several teenagers in Alderley Edge in Cheshire, a wealthy village in the North West of England. It is noted for attempting to purvey 'drama all the time'. It has been compared to the American reality television shows, Laguna Beach: The Real Orange County and Newport Harbor: The Real Orange County. There are no plans for any future series.

Overview

Living on the Edge is structured as a traditional narrative (seen more commonly in fictionalised television dramas or soap operas) than a straightforward observant documentary. Its slogan is "LA Lifestyle, Cheshire Postcode".

The theme tune for the show is "Shooting Star" by Air Traffic.

Series 1

 UK premiere date: 14 October 2007
 Narrative voice: Esme Conway
 Number of episodes: 8

Participants: JUDDERS et al.

Series 2

 UK premiere date: 12 October 2008
 Narrative voice: Rachael Zapolski
 Number of episodes: 10

Steven was the only returning participant from series 1. The new participants were: Rachael, Oz, Josh, Liv, Milly, Sasha, Jack, Owain, Sophie, Toby, Will and Matt.

See also
The Only Way is Essex

References

External links
 Living on the Edge at MTV.co.uk

MTV original programming
British reality television series
2007 British television series debuts
2008 British television series endings
Television series by All3Media